In chemistry and biology a cross-link is a bond or a short sequence of bonds that links one polymer chain to another. These links may take the form of covalent bonds or ionic bonds and the polymers can be either synthetic polymers or natural polymers (such as proteins).

In polymer chemistry "cross-linking" usually refers to the use of cross-links to promote a change in the polymers' physical properties.

When "crosslinking" is used in the biological field, it refers to the use of a probe to link proteins together to check for protein–protein interactions, as well as other creative cross-linking methodologies.

Although the term is used to refer to the "linking of polymer chains" for both sciences, the extent of crosslinking and specificities of the crosslinking agents vary greatly. As with all science, there are overlaps, and the following delineations are a starting point to understanding the subtleties.

Polymer chemistry
Crosslinking is the general term for the process of forming covalent bonds or relatively short sequences of chemical bonds to join two polymer chains together. The term curing refers to the crosslinking of thermosetting resins, such as unsaturated polyester and epoxy resin, and the term vulcanization is characteristically used for rubbers. When polymer chains are crosslinked, the material becomes more rigid.

In polymer chemistry, when a synthetic polymer is said to be "cross-linked", it usually means that the entire bulk of the polymer has been exposed to the cross-linking method. The resulting modification of mechanical properties depends strongly on the cross-link density. Low cross-link densities increase the viscosities of polymer melts. Intermediate cross-link densities transform gummy polymers into materials that have elastomeric properties and potentially high strengths. Very high cross-link densities can cause materials to become very rigid or glassy, such as phenol-formaldehyde materials.

Formation
Cross-links can be formed by chemical reactions that are initiated by heat, pressure, change in pH, or irradiation. For example, mixing of an unpolymerized or partially polymerized resin with specific chemicals called crosslinking reagents results in a chemical reaction that forms cross-links. Cross-linking can also be induced in materials that are normally thermoplastic through exposure to a radiation source, such as electron beam exposure, gamma radiation, or UV light. For example, electron beam processing is used to cross-link the C type of cross-linked polyethylene. Other types of cross-linked polyethylene are made by addition of peroxide during extruding (type A) or by addition of a cross-linking agent (e.g. vinylsilane) and a catalyst during extruding and then performing a post-extrusion curing.

The chemical process of vulcanization is a type of cross-linking that changes rubber to the hard, durable material associated with car and bike tires. This process is often called sulfur curing; the term vulcanization comes from Vulcan, the Roman god of fire. This is, however, a slower process. A typical car tire is cured for 15 minutes at 150 °C. However, the time can be reduced by the addition of accelerators such as 2-benzothiazolethiol or tetramethylthiuram disulfide. Both of these contain a sulfur atom in the molecule that initiates the reaction of the sulfur chains with the rubber. Accelerators increase the rate of cure by catalysing the addition of sulfur chains to the rubber molecules.

Cross-links are the characteristic property of thermosetting plastic materials. In most cases, cross-linking is irreversible, and the resulting thermosetting material will degrade or burn if heated, without melting. Especially in the case of commercially used plastics, once a substance is cross-linked, the product is very hard or impossible to recycle. In some cases, though, if the cross-link bonds are sufficiently different, chemically, from the bonds forming the polymers, the process can be reversed. Permanent wave solutions, for example, break and re-form naturally occurring cross-links (disulfide bonds) between protein chains in hair.

Physical cross-links
Where chemical cross-links are covalent bonds, physical cross-links are formed by weak interactions. For example, sodium alginate gels upon exposure to calcium ion, which allows it to form ionic bonds that bridge between alginate chains. Polyvinyl alcohol gels upon the addition of borax through hydrogen bonding between boric acid and the polymer's alcohol groups. Other examples of materials which form physically cross-linked gels include gelatin, collagen, agarose, and agar agar.

Chemical covalent cross-links are stable mechanically and thermally, so once formed are difficult to break. Therefore, cross-linked products like car tires cannot be recycled easily. A class of polymers known as thermoplastic elastomers rely on physical cross-links in their microstructure to achieve stability, and are widely used in non-tire applications, such as snowmobile tracks, and catheters for medical use. They offer a much wider range of properties than conventional cross-linked elastomers because the domains that act as cross-links are reversible, so can be reformed by heat. The stabilizing domains may be non-crystalline (as in styrene-butadiene block copolymers) or crystalline as in thermoplastic copolyesters.

Note: A rubber which cannot be reformed by heat or chemical treatment is called a thermoset elastomer. On the other hand, a thermoplastic elastomer can be molded and recycled by heat.

Oxidative cross-links
Many polymers undergo oxidative cross-linking, typically when exposed to atmospheric oxygen. In some cases this is undesirable and thus polymerization reactions may involve the use of an antioxidant to slow the formation of oxidative cross-links. In other cases, when formation of cross-links by oxidation is desirable, an oxidizer such as hydrogen peroxide may be used to speed up the process.

The aforementioned process of applying a permanent wave to hair is one example of oxidative cross-linking. In that process the disulfide bonds are reduced, typically using a mercaptan such as ammonium thioglycolate. Following this, the hair is curled and then "neutralized". The neutralizer is typically an acidic solution of hydrogen peroxide, which causes new disulfide bonds to form under conditions of oxidation, thus permanently fixing the hair into its new configuration.
It also happens for gluten which change structure of foods.

In biology
Proteins naturally present in the body can contain crosslinks generated by enzyme-catalyzed or spontaneous reactions. Such crosslinks are important in generating mechanically stable structures such as hair, skin, and cartilage. Disulfide bond formation is one of the most common crosslinks, but isopeptide bond formation is also common. Proteins can also be cross-linked artificially using small-molecule crosslinkers. Compromised collagen in the cornea, a condition known as keratoconus, can be treated with clinical crosslinking.

In biological context crosslinking could play a role in atherosclerosis through advanced glycation end-products (AGEs), which have been implicated to induce crosslinking of collagen, which may lead to vascular stiffening.

Use in protein study
The interactions or mere proximity of proteins can be studied by the clever use of crosslinking agents. For example, protein A and protein B may be very close to each other in a cell, and a chemical crosslinker could be used to probe the protein–protein interaction between these two proteins by linking them together, disrupting the cell, and looking for the crosslinked proteins.

A variety of crosslinkers are used to analyze subunit structure of proteins, protein interactions, and various parameters of protein function by using differing crosslinkers, often with diverse spacer arm lengths. Subunit structure is deduced, since crosslinkers bind only surface residues in relatively close proximity in the native state. Protein interactions are often too weak or transient to be easily detected, but by crosslinking, the interactions can be stabilized, captured, and analyzed.

Examples of some common crosslinkers are the imidoester crosslinker dimethyl suberimidate, the N-Hydroxysuccinimide-ester crosslinker BS3 and formaldehyde. Each of these crosslinkers induces nucleophilic attack of the amino group of lysine and subsequent covalent bonding via the crosslinker. The zero-length carbodiimide crosslinker EDC functions by converting carboxyls into amine-reactive isourea intermediates that bind to lysine residues or other available primary amines. SMCC or its water-soluble analog, Sulfo-SMCC, is commonly used to prepare antibody-hapten conjugates for antibody development.

In-vitro cross-linking method, termed PICUP (photo-induced cross-linking of unmodified proteins), was developed in 1999. They devised a process in which ammonium persulfate (APS), which acts as an electron acceptor, and [[tris(bipyridine)ruthenium(II) chloride|tris-bipyridylruthenium (II) cation are added to the protein of interest and irradiated with UV light. PICUP is more expeditious and high yielding compared to previous chemical cross-linking methods.

In-vivo crosslinking of protein complexes using photo-reactive amino acid analogs was introduced in 2005 by researchers from the Max Planck Institute of Molecular Cell Biology and Genetics. In this method, cells are grown with photoreactive diazirine analogs to leucine and methionine, which are incorporated into proteins. Upon exposure to ultraviolet light, the diazirines are activated and bind to interacting proteins that are within a few ångströms of the photo-reactive amino acid analog (UV cross-linking).

In material science
Wide usage of the term cross-linking is also described as vulcanization in material science and engineering, mainly addressing the fast reaction between monomers and polymers and branches of rubber. Cross-linking or interlinking m of polymers can improve the mechanical properties of the polymeric material and also can improve the adhesion between two interfaces of the coating.

Promote the mechanical properties of material

Cross-linked polymers, monomers, and branches can improve the bulk mechanical properties of the material and mostly decrease the viscosity of non-solid materials.

The earliest examples of crosslinking, linking long chains of polymers together to increase strength and mass, involved tires. Rubber was vulcanized with sulfur under heat, which created a link between latex models.

Synthetically crosslinked polymers have many uses, including those in the biological sciences, such as applications in forming polyacrylamide gels for gel electrophoresis. Synthetic rubber used for tires is made by crosslinking rubber through the process of vulcanization. This crosslinking makes them more elastic. Hard-shell kayaks are also often manufactured with crosslinked polymers.

In many hydraulic fracturing treatments, a delayed gel-cross-linker fluid is used to carry out fracture treatment of the rock.

Promote the adhesion of coatings

Two interlinked layers of the interface can increase the adhesion strength of the coating to the surface.

Other examples of polymers that can be crosslinked are ethylene-vinyl acetate – as used in solar panel manufacturing – and polyethylene.

Alkyd enamels, the dominant type of commercial oil-based paint, cure by oxidative crosslinking after exposure to air.

Measuring degree of crosslinking
Crosslinking is often measured by swelling tests. The crosslinked sample is placed into a good solvent at a specific temperature, and either the change in mass or the change in volume is measured. The more crosslinking, the less swelling is attainable. Based on the degree of swelling, the Flory Interaction Parameter (which relates the solvent interaction with the sample), and the density of the solvent, the theoretical degree of crosslinking can be calculated according to Flory's Network Theory. Two ASTM standards are commonly used to describe the degree of crosslinking in thermoplastics. In ASTM D2765, the sample is weighed, then placed in a solvent for 24 hours, weighed again while swollen, then dried and weighed a final time. The degree of swelling and the soluble portion can be calculated. In another ASTM standard, F2214, the sample is placed in an instrument that measures the height change in the sample, allowing the user to measure the volume change. The crosslink density can then be calculated.

See also
Branching (polymer chemistry)
Cross-linked enzyme aggregate
Cross-linked polyethylene (PEX)
Crosslinking of DNA
Fixation (histology)
Phenol formaldehyde resin (phenolic resin)

References

External links
Application note on how to measure degree of crosslinking in plastics

Ageing processes
Polymer chemistry
Protein–protein interaction assays
Rubber properties